Antanas Juknevičius (born ) is a Lithuanian rally driver. He is one of the most experienced and successful professional Rally-raid drivers in Lithuania. Juknevicius is the only driver from the Baltic states to participate in every single stage of the FIA World Cup for Cross Country Rallies.

Career
Juknevičius debuted in his first Dakar Rally back in 2003 as a co-driver for Aurelijus Petraitis. In 2009, Antanas Juknevicius and Aurelijus Petraitis crossed the finish line of the Dakar Rally in the 25th position overall which at the time was his personal best result. In 2018 Juknevicius improved his personal record by finishing the Dakar Rally in 12th position, after gaining four places during the penultimate stage of a rally. Overall, Antanas Juknevicius has participated in the Dakar Rally 11 times, 8 times as a driver and his first 3 rallies as a co-driver. This does not include the rally in 2008, where he was also at the start line but rally was cancelled.

Juknevičius is also one of the few Dakar Rally participants who took part in this event in all three continents this rally marathon has been held over the years.

In addition to his racing career Juknevičius spent five years working for Astana Racing as a general team manager.

In 2019, Antanas Juknevicius was officially granted status of Dakar Rally legend.

Dakar Rally
Juknevičius has reached the finish line in 11 out of 12 Dakar Rallies he has started at with his personal best result being 12th overall in 2018. Since the introduction of T1+ class in 2022 Juknevičius sought to upgrade to a T1+ vehicle  for the 2023 Dakar Rally. After failing to secure one, he opted to skip the event.

Career achievements 
Dakar Rally 2018 - 12th place overall
Rally Kazakhstan 2017 – 6th place overall
Rally Kazakhstan 2016 – 3rd place overall, 1st in T2 category
Abu Dhabi Desert Challenge 2011 – 6th place overall 
Dakar series / Silk Way Rally 2009 – 10th place overall
Libya Desert Challenge 2008 - 1st place overall
BAJA (LT) 2007 - 1st place overall
BAJA (LV) 2007 - 2nd place overall
BAJA (BY) 2006 - 1st place overall
Optic Tunis 2006 - 8th place overall
PHARAONS Rally Egypt 2006 - 7th place overall
24 Heures de FRANCE 2006 - 4th place overall
Oman Desert Challenge 2006 - 2nd place overall
UAE Dubai Rally 2005 - 9th place overall

References

External links
 Official site

1974 births
Living people
Dakar Rally drivers
Lithuanian racing drivers